The gymnastics competition at the 2013 Gymnasiade was held from November to December 2013 in Brasília.

Medal winners

Artistic gymnastics

Rhythmic gymnastics

Aerobic gymnastics

Results

Women's artistic gymnastics

Team final

All-around

Vault

Uneven bars

Balance beam

Floor exercise

Overall medal table

See also 
 Gymnastics at the 2018 Gymnasiade
 Gymnastics at the 2022 Gymnasiade

References

Gymnasiade
2013 Gymnasiade
2013 Gymnasiade
International gymnastics competitions hosted by Brazil
Gymnasiade